Mabeskraal is a town in Bojanala District Municipality in the North West province of South Africa.

Mabeskraal is a village formerly known as Tlhakong in old Bophutatswana now North-West Province. It is led by Kgosi Moshe Molopyane Mabe.

The village has five primary schools and one high schools. Primary schools are Moetlo, Motsisi, Mabeskraal, Molotsi and Makweleng. The high school is Rakoko High School which is the school that has produced prominent individuals. It is approximately 72 km from Rustenburg Town and about 30 minutes' drive to Pilanesberg and Sun City lodges.

References

Populated places in the Moses Kotane Local Municipality